These are the official results of the women's 4 × 100 metres relay event at the 1976 Summer Olympics in Montreal, Quebec, Canada. The event was held on 30 and 31 July 1976.  There were a total number of 10 nations competing.

Medalists

Records
These were the standing World and Olympic records (in seconds) prior to the 1976 Summer Olympics.

Results

Final
Held on Saturday 31 July 1976

Heats
Held on Friday 30 July 1976

Heat 1

Heat 2

References

External links
 Official Report
 Results

R
Relay foot races at the Olympics
1976 in women's athletics
Women's events at the 1976 Summer Olympics